Rissoina redferni is a species of minute sea snail, a marine gastropod mollusk or micromollusk in the family Rissoinidae.

Distribution
This species occurs in the Caribbean Sea and in the Atlantic Ocean off the Bahamas.

Description 
The maximum recorded shell length is 8.5 mm.

Habitat 
Minimum recorded depth is 0 m. Maximum recorded depth is 30 m.

References

 Espinosa J. & Ortea J. (2002) Descripción de cuatro nuevas especies de la familia Rissoinidae (Mollusca: Gastropoda). Avicennia 15: 141-146. page(s): 142

Rissoinidae
Gastropods described in 2002